Kangru is a small borough in Kiili Parish, Harju County, Estonia, about  south of Tallinn. It has a population of 431 (as of 2009).

Kangru gained its small borough status on 18 August 2008; before that it was a village.

References

Boroughs and small boroughs in Estonia